The Sawridge First Nation is a First Nations band government in northern Alberta. Headquartered in the town of Slave Lake, it controls two Indian reserves, Sawridge 150G and Sawridge 150H.

References

First Nations governments in Alberta
Cree governments